Yalabad or Yelabad may refer to:

Yalabad, Markazi
Yalabad, Qazvin